Saleh al-Somali, born Abdirizaq Abdi Saleh, was described as being an al-Qaeda leader and the group's head of external operations.
He was killed by a missile fired from an unmanned predator drone on December 8, 2009.
The missile strike was on a suspect compound in Janikhel village near Pakistan's Federally Administered Tribal Areas, today a part of the Khyber Pakhtunkhwa.

Initially the identity of the senior al Qaida leader reported killed was not made public.  But on December 11, 2009 ABC News quoted a US security official who said: "There are strong indications that senior al Qaeda operations planner Saleh al-Somali has been killed".

References

2009 deaths
Al-Qaeda planners
Somalian al-Qaeda members
Somalian Sunni Muslims
Somalian Islamists
Deaths by United States drone strikes in Pakistan
Year of birth missing
Somalian expatriates in Pakistan